Maurice René Michel Jacob ( – ) was a French theoretical particle physicist.

Biography 
Maurice Jacob studied physics at École normale supérieure from 1953 to 1957. During a visit to the Brookhaven National Laboratory in 1959, he developed with Gian-Carlo Wick the helicity formalism for relativistic  description  of  scattering  of  particles  with  spin  and  the  decay  of particles  and  resonant  states. In 1961, he obtained a doctorate on this subject at the University of Paris. His thesis advisors were professors Francis Perrin and Gian-Carlo Wick. Jacob then moved, as a post-doctoral fellow, to Caltech. He worked in Saclay from 1961 to 1967. Since 1967, he has worked at CERN until his retirement in 1998. From 1982 to 1988, he headed the theoretical physics division of CERN and in the 1990s, he was responsible for CERN's relations with its Member States.

Maurice Jacob's research focuses on the phenomenology of strong interactions, including diffraction, scaling, high-transverse-momentum processes and the formation of quark–gluon plasma. In particular, he pioneered the studies of inclusive hadron-production processes, including scaling and its violations. He contributed also to the field of accelerator physics together with Tai Tsun Wu.

He supported Carlo Rubbia during the construction of the Super Proton Synchrotron (SPS) in the 1980s.

Jacob chaired the French Physical Society from 1985 to 2002 and from 1991 to 1993 he was president of the European Physical Society. In 1993, he became a member of the American Physical Society. He was co-editor of Physics Letters B and Physics Reports.

He was appointed member of the CNRS scientific council in 1988.

He was a corresponding member of the Academy of Sciences from 1977, member of the Swedish Royal Academies, Academia Europaea and also scientific advisor to the European Space Agency

Awards and honors 
  CNRS Silver Medal (1967)
 Legion of Honour (1994)

Marriage and children 
Maurice Jacob was married to Lise Jacob. Together they have 4 children  Jimmy, Thierry, Francis, and Irène.

References 

Particle physicists
Theoretical physicists
People associated with CERN
1933 births
2007 deaths
École Normale Supérieure alumni
Chevaliers of the Légion d'honneur
University of Paris alumni
Members of the French Academy of Sciences
Academic journal editors
20th-century French physicists
Members of Academia Europaea
21st-century French physicists
Scientists from Lyon
Presidents of the European Physical Society
Members of the Royal Swedish Academy of Sciences
Presidents of the Société Française de Physique
Fellows of the American Physical Society